Simonds Catholic College is a Roman Catholic school for boys located in Melbourne. The school consists of one campus. The St Mary's campus (years 7-12) is in West Melbourne and is within walking distance of the Queen Victoria Market. .

History
Simonds was formed in 1996 through the amalgamation of Cathedral College, East Melbourne and St Mary's Boys School. In 2010, the former St Brigid's Primary School in North Fitzroy was renovated, and a new senior campus of the college was opened there. The school is named after Justin Simonds, the first Australian-born Archbishop of Melbourne from 1963–67. He also served as parish priest of St Mary's where the years 7-9 campus is located.

Houses
Students at Simonds are placed into houses for the duration of their time at the school. The school’s houses; Goold, Knox, Mannix and Polding, are all named after previous Archbishops of Melbourne

Throughout the year students earn points for their houses through house sports, co-curriculum activities, academic performance, etc. The main house competitions are the Swimming Carnival and the Athletics Carnival. High performing students in these events are selected to represent the school in the Associated Catholic Colleges Swimming and Athletics Championships.

References

External links
 Simonds Catholic College Website

Catholic secondary schools in Melbourne
Educational institutions established in 1996
Boys' schools in Victoria (Australia)
1996 establishments in Australia
Buildings and structures in the City of Melbourne (LGA)
Buildings and structures in the City of Yarra